Protomelas is a genus of haplochromine cichlids endemic to Lake Malawi in East Africa. The genus is part of the haplochromine tribe and have maternal mouthbrooding and sexual dimorphism typical of this group. Popular in the aquarium hobby, Protomelas species are sold under a variety of trade names (e.g., Taiwan Reef Cichlid, Red Empress Cichlid).

Species
There are currently 16 recognized species in this genus:
 Protomelas annectens (Regan, 1922)
 Protomelas dejunctus Stauffer, 1993 (fire blue hap)
 Protomelas fenestratus (Trewavas, 1935) (fenestratus hap)
 Protomelas insignis (Trewavas, 1935) (one-and-a-half-stripe hap)
 Protomelas kirkii (Günther, 1894)
Protomelas krampus 
 Protomelas labridens (Trewavas, 1935)
 Protomelas macrodon Eccles, 1989
 Protomelas marginatus (Trewavas, 1935)
 Protomelas pleurotaenia (Boulenger, 1901)
 Protomelas similis (Regan, 1922)
 Protomelas spilonotus (Trewavas, 1935)
 Protomelas spilopterus (Trewavas, 1935)
 Protomelas taeniolatus (Trewavas, 1935) (red empress, spindle hap)
 Protomelas triaenodon (Trewavas, 1935)
 Protomelas virgatus (Trewavas, 1935)

References

 
Haplochromini

Cichlid genera
Taxa named by Ethelwynn Trewavas